Paul Schultz is a New Zealand former rugby league footballer who represented New Zealand in the 1968 World Cup.

Playing career
Schultz played for Marist in the Auckland Rugby League competition and was part of the 1965 and 1966 champion sides. Schultz later played for Point Chevalier. He represented Auckland and was part of the sides that defeated South Africa 10–4 in 1963 and Australia in 1969.

Schultz was first selected for New Zealand in 1965 and played eight test matches in total. He was included in the Kiwis squad for the 1968 World Cup.

Paul Schultz is the younger brother of the rugby league footballer; Bill Schultz.

References

Living people
New Zealand rugby league players
New Zealand national rugby league team players
Auckland rugby league team players
Marist Saints players
Point Chevalier Pirates players
Rugby league centres
Rugby league five-eighths
Year of birth missing (living people)